Eddie Vaughn is a former women's basketball coach. He served as the head coach of the Mississippi State Bulldogs women's basketball team for the 1984–85 season, compiling a record of 8–19. He had been named interim coach in August 1984 after the sudden resignation of Peggy Collins. After the season, he hoped to be named permanent coach, but the Bulldogs instead hired Brenda Paul.

He later served as head coach of the men's team at Neosho County Community College and as a men's assistant coach at Marshall and Louisiana–Lafayette, along with coaching at several high schools over the years.

Head coaching record

References

American women's basketball coaches
Mississippi State Bulldogs women's basketball coaches
Louisiana Ragin' Cajuns men's basketball coaches
Year of birth missing
Possibly living people